Knowlton is a surname. Notable people with the surname include:

Andrew Knowlton, American magazine editor and television personality
Austin Eldon Knowlton (1909–2003), American architect
Bill Knowlton (1898–1944), American baseball pitcher
Charles Knowlton (1800–1850), American physician and writer
Daniel Gibson Knowlton (1922–2015), American bookbinder
David Clark Knowlton, American social anthropologist and contributor to Mormonism: A Historical Encyclopedia
Ebenezer Knowlton (1815–1874), American politician and minister
Edward U. Knowlton (1933–2016), American physician and politician
Frank Hall Knowlton (1860–1926), American paleobotanist
Grace Knowlton (1932–2020), American sculptor
James H. Knowlton (1813–1879), American politician
Ken Knowlton, American computer graphics pioneer and artist
Miles Justice Knowlton (1825–1874), American missionary
Richard Knowlton, former CEO of the Hormel company
Thomas Knowlton (1740–1776), American military officer
William A. Knowlton (1920–2008), American army general
Wiram Knowlton (1816–1863), American politician